Wang Shin-yuan (born 23 June 1976) is a Taiwanese weightlifter. His personal best is 282.5 kg.

He competed in Weightlifting at the 2008 Summer Olympics in the 56 kg division representing Chinese Taipei. He finished seventh with 265 kg.

He is 5 ft 2 inches tall and weighs 130 lb.

References

External links
 NBC profile

1976 births
Living people
Weightlifters at the 1996 Summer Olympics
Weightlifters at the 2000 Summer Olympics
Weightlifters at the 2004 Summer Olympics
Weightlifters at the 2008 Summer Olympics
Olympic weightlifters of Taiwan
Asian Games medalists in weightlifting
Weightlifters at the 1998 Asian Games
Weightlifters at the 2002 Asian Games
Weightlifters at the 2006 Asian Games
Taiwanese male weightlifters
Asian Games silver medalists for Chinese Taipei
Medalists at the 1998 Asian Games
Medalists at the 2002 Asian Games
20th-century Taiwanese people
21st-century Taiwanese people